Paris Revolutions was a French daily newspaper published during the French Revolution from 1789 to 1794.

History 
From 12 July 1789, the date of its first publication, the daily newspaper enjoyed great success. Camille Desmoulins advanced the figure of two hundred thousand readers which appears exaggerated. The newspaper was pro-revolutionary, but readers with moderate opinions appreciated the subtlety of its political analyses.

The main editors of the journal were Elisée Loustalot, Sylvain Maréchal, Pierre-Gaspard Chaumette, Fabre d'Églantine, Léger-Félicité Sonthonax.

On 28 February 1794, the publisher Louis Marie Prudhomme ceased the publication of his newspaper. Pro-revolutionary in 1789, he was suspected of modérantisme under the Reign of Terror and chose to cease publication to avoid execution.

Bibliography

External links 

 Consulter les numéros des Révolutions de Paris sur Gallica, bibliothèque numérique de la BnF

Newspapers of the French Revolution
1789 establishments
1794 disestablishments